Tangerine is an album by saxophonist Dexter Gordon which was recorded in 1972 and released on the Prestige label.

Reception

Lindsay Planer of Allmusic states, "It certainly ranks up there as one of Gordon's greats". Derek Taylor reviewed the CD reissue for All About Jazz in 2000 stating "While this disc isn’t a classic on par with say much of his Blue Note work it still offers up immediate proof of why he resides in the upper echelon of the tenor saxophone hierarchy".

Track listing 
All compositions by Dexter Gordon except where noted
 "Tangerine" (Johnny Mercer, Victor Schertzinger) - 8:54   
 "August Blues" - 9:47   
 "What It Was" - 8:07
 "Days of Wine and Roses" (Henry Mancini, Mercer) - 8:43
Recorded at Van Gelder Studio in Englewood Cliffs, New Jersey on June 22 (tracks 1-3) and June 28 (track 4), 1972

Personnel 
Dexter Gordon - tenor saxophone
Thad Jones - trumpet, flugelhorn (tracks 1-3)
Hank Jones (tracks 1-3), Cedar Walton (track 4) - piano
Stanley Clarke (tracks 1-3), Buster Williams (tracks 4) - bass
Louis Hayes (tracks 1-3), Billy Higgins (tracks 4) - drums

References 

Dexter Gordon albums
1975 albums
Prestige Records albums
Albums produced by Ozzie Cadena
Albums recorded at Van Gelder Studio